Meme is a department of Southwest Region in Cameroon. The department covers an area of 3,105 km and as of 2005 had a total population of 326,734. The capital of the department lies at Kumba.

Subdivisions
The department is divided administratively into 4 districts and in turn into sub-districts and villages. Central Kumba is further divided into 3 sub-districts; Kumba I, Kumba II and Kumba III.

Communes 
 Konye
 Central Kumba
 Kumba I
 Kumba II
 Kumba III
 Mbonge
 Mungo Central:
Mombo
 Penja
 Loum

References

Departments of Cameroon
Southwest Region (Cameroon)